The 2016 Lamar Cardinals football team represented Lamar University in the 2016 NCAA Division I FCS football season. The Cardinals were led by seventh-year head coach Ray Woodard and played their home games at Provost Umphrey Stadium. They were a member of the Southland Conference. They finished the season 3–8, 3–6 in Southland play to finish in a tie for eighth place.

TV and radio media
All Lamar games will be broadcast on KLVI, also known as News Talk 560.

Live video of all home games (except those broadcast via the American Sports Network) will be streamed on ESPN3.

Previous season
In 2015, the Cardinals finished the season 5–6 overall.  In Southland play, the Cardinals had a 4–5 record finishing in a three-way tie for fifth place.

Team records
Several Southland Conference and team marks were broken.  Kade Harrington broke the Southland Conference and team records for rushing yards in a game and in a season.  He also set school records in all-purpose yards in a game and in a season and in consecutive games with over 100 yards gained.

Honors and recognition

Kade Harrington

All-American - Kade Harrington was named to the AP All-America Team, 1st team; FCS Stats All-American, 1st team; College Sports Madness All-American, 1st team; and American Football Coaches Association All-American, 1st team.
Player of the Year - Harrington was an FCS Player of the Year Finalist, finishing second in voting missing out on first place by 29 votes.  He was also named Southland Conference Player of the Year and American Sports Network Player of the Year.

Harrington led the nation in the following categories:
Rushing - 2092 yards
Rushing yards per game - 190.2
Rushing touchdowns - 21
All-purpose yards per game - 213.9

SLC All-Conference
Ten Cardinals received Southland Conference All-Conference recognition at the conclusion of the 2015 season.  Four Cardinals were named to the SLC All-Conference 1st team on offense.  Those players were Kade Harrington, running back; Reggie Begelton, wide receiver; and Cody Elenz and Bret Treadway, offensive line.  Larance Hale was named to the SLC All-Conference 1st team on defense as defensive lineman.  Rodney Randle was named to the SLC All-Conference 2nd team on defense as kick returner.  Four Cardinals received honorable mention honors.  Those included DeAndre Jennings and Justin Brock on offense.  Logan Moss and Xavier Bethany received honorable mention recognition on defense.

Post Season Play
Brent Nicholson, deep snapper for the Cardinals, was invited to play in the National Bowl, an All-Star game for non-FBS seniors.

Before the season

Changes in the coaching staff
Trey Haverty - Trey Haverty was named defensive coordinator on January 26, 2016.  He replaces Craig McGallion, who announced his retirement in November, 2015.  Haverty has ten years of collegiate coaching experience including positions at TCU and Texas Tech.
John Blake - Former Oklahoma head coach, John Blake, joined the Cardinals coaching staff in February, 2016.  He was responsible for the defensive line.  After one month at Lamar and during the Cardinals' spring camp, John Blake accepted the defensive line coach position with the Buffalo Bills following the Bill's firing of Karl Dunbar. Blake had also held positions with the Dallas Cowboys, North Carolina, Nebraska, Mississippi State, and Tulsa.  
Willie Mack Garza - Willie Mack Garza also joined the Cardinals staff in January.  He will be working with the secondary.  Garza has also had seventeen years of experience at the collegiate level including stops at USC, Tennessee, TCU, Western Michigan, and North Dakota State.
 Eric Roark - Eric Roark was named defensive line coach on April 19, 2016.  Roark fills the position vacated by John Blake's move to the Buffalo Bills staff.  Roark coached at Division I programs UTSA, SMU, Middle Tennessee State, Tennessee Tech, and Murray State.

Spring camp and 6th annual Crawfish Bowl
The Cardinals participated in Spring camp from March 7 ending with the 6th annual Crawfish Bowl Spring game on April 16.  Camp included workouts three days each week with a break from March 14–18 for Spring Break.  The offense defeated the defense 25-23 in the Crawfish Bowl Spring game.

Roster changes
2015 1st team All-Southland Conference member, Larance Hale, was dismissed from the team on March 29, 2016 for a violation of team rules.

Honors and recognition

Pre-season FCS All-America team
Athlon Sports 2016 FCS All-America team - Kade Harrington was named to the pre-season Athlon Sports 2016 FCS All-America team.
STATS 2016 FCS All-America team - Kade Harrington was named to the 1st team pre-season STATS 2016 FCS All-America team.  Bret Treadway was named to the STATS FCS pre-season 3rd team.
College Sports Madness 2016 FCS All-America team - Kade Harrington was named to the 1st team pre-season College Sports Madness 2016 FCS All-America team.  Bret Treadway was named to the College Sports Madness FCS pre-season 3rd team.

Pre-season Southland Conference team
Four Cardinals were named to pre-season Southland Conference teams.  Kade Harrington, Bret Treadway, and Rodney Randle were named as 1st teamers.  Brendan Langley was named to the 2nd team.

2016 recruiting
The Cardinals signed 28 players including 22 high school recruits and six transfers from other colleges.  Three of the transfers were from NCAA Division I (FBS) programs.  Four of the recruits were already enrolled for the spring, 2016 semester while 24 signed letters of intent on National Signing Day.

Early enrollees
Four recruits transferring from other programs enrolled for Spring, 2016 semester courses at Lamar.  The four players are Jalen Barnes from Texas Tech, Kanon Mackey from Texas State, Marcus Daggs from Cisco College, and Clayton Turner from Miami (FL).  The list includes ratings when originally recruited from high school.

Source:

2016 National Signing Day
Lamar signed 24 players on national letter of intent day. Recruits are listed in the "2016 Recruits" table below. Player profiles for each recruit are available at the signing day link below.  The 2016 signing day recruits included 22 players from high school and 2 transfers.

Post Signing Day Transfers
Andrew Allen transferred from New Mexico State.  He has two years of eligibility remaining.  Allen started 8 games and played in 17 games for the Aggies.  He had 1,700 yards passing and 16 touchdowns, and rushed for 352 yards for New Mexico State.  Ratings are from the high school recruiting period.

Roster

Schedule
Lamar University announced its 2016 football schedule on February 17, 2016.  According to the announcement, the 2016 schedule will consist of eleven games with a conference schedule of nine games.  Out of conference games are the season home opener against the Coastal Carolina Chanticleers which will be in its first year of transition to NCAA Division I (FBS), followed by an away game against NCAA Division I (FBS) American Athletic Conference member, Houston Cougars.  Six of the games, including five Southland Conference games, will be played at home at Provost Umphrey Stadium.

Game summaries

Coastal Carolina

Sources:

@ Houston

Sources:

Sam Houston State

Sources:

Southeastern Louisiana

Sources:

@ Abilene Christian

Sources:

Northwestern State

Sources:

@ Central Arkansas

Sources:

Houston Baptist (Homecoming Game)

Sources:

@ Nicholls

Sources:

Incarnate Word

Sources: Box Score

@ McNeese State

Sources:

References

Lamar
Lamar Cardinals football seasons
Lamar Cardinals football